Cantharidoscops clausus is a species of sea snail, a marine gastropod mollusk in the family Trochidae, the top snails.

Description
The shell grows to a length of 35 mm.

Distribution
This marine species occurs off the Kurile Islands.

Habitat
This species is found in the following habitats:
 Brackish
 Marine

References

External links
 To World Register of Marine Species

clausus
Gastropods described in 1978